Santa Cruz often abbreviated as Sta. Cruz is a barangay located in the San Francisco Del Monte district of Quezon City with an approximate land area of 44 hectares bounded by South and West Triangles in the East, Quezon Avenue and Barangay Paligsahan in the South, Nayong Kanluran in the Northeast and Barangay Paltok in the North.

Neighboring barangays include Mariblo, Paraiso, Paltok, Talayan, Sto. Domingo, Paligsahan, West and South Triangles under the first and fourth Legislative districts in Quezon City, Metro Manila, Philippines.

Its barangay hall is located near Mariblo bridge, separating the area with Barangay Mariblo.

Landmarks 
Fisher Mall, the former Pantranco bus terminal site, is located at the corner of Roosevelt and Quezon Avenues, while Halili School of Ballet and Phoenix Publishing House are found along Quezon Avenue. PMI Colleges also has presence in the area.

Heroes Hill, encompassing more than three-fourths (3/4) of the entire barangay, is a closed gated community developed by Trans-American Sales and Exposition for former American soldiers in the Philippine-American War.

Barangay and Sangguniang Kabataan officials

List of Punong Barangay

Members of Sangguniang Barangay

The new Barangay and SK Councils were elected on May 14, 2018.

Demography 
As of the 2015 census of the National Statistics Office (Philippines), the population of Santa Cruz is 4,784.

See also
Fisher Mall
Barangays of Quezon City
Legislative districts of Quezon City
Quezon City
Barangay elections

References

Quezon City
Barangays of Quezon City
Barangays of Metro Manila